William Howard Hart (1863-1937) was an American painter.

References

1863 births
1937 deaths
American male painters
Painters from New York (state)
People from Fishkill, New York
19th-century American painters
20th-century American painters
19th-century American male artists
20th-century American male artists